Rhabdosargus sarba, also known as the goldlined seabream, silver bream, tarwhine, or yellowfin bream, is a species of fish in the seabream family, Sparidae. This species occurs Red Sea and the Persian Gulf to Eastern Cape, South Africa, eastwards to the South China Sea and Japan, and southwards to Australia.

Body oblong, moderately deep and compressed. Maximum total length 60 cm, commonly to 40 cm. Head large; upper profile convex, most strongly arched from snout to origin of dorsal fin; eye moderate to small in large specimens; mouth almost horizontal, low. Dorsal fin single, with XI or XII slender spines and 13 (rarely 12) to 15 soft rays, third and fourth spines longest. Anal fin with III spines and 11 soft rays, second and third spines subequal; pectoral fins long. Pelvic fins not reaching anus. Caudal fin forked.

Bottom-living coastal fish, to a depth of 60 m, sometimes entering estuaries. Spawning takes place near river mouths; after a short planktonic period, the young fish move into the estuaries, which act as nurseries, and move out into deeper waters with growth. Feeds on bottom invertebrates, mainly molluscs.

References

sarba
Fish described in 1775
Taxa named by Peter Forsskål